Steffi Graf defeated Martina Navratilova in the final, 6–4, 4–6, 8–6 to win the women's singles tennis title at the 1987 French Open. It was her first major singles title, and the first of an eventual 22 such titles.

Chris Evert was the two-time defending champion, but was defeated by Navratilova in the semifinals in a rematch of the previous three years' finals.

This tournament marked the major debut for future world No. 1 and French Open champion Arantxa Sánchez Vicario.

Seeds

Qualifying

Draw

Finals

Top half

Section 1

Section 2

Section 3

Section 4

Bottom half

Section 5

Section 6

Section 7

Section 8

References

External links
1987 French Open – Women's draws and results at the International Tennis Federation

Women's Singles
French Open by year – Women's singles
French Open - Women's Singles
1987 in women's tennis
1987 in French women's sport